The 1966 Pacific Tigers football team represented the University of the Pacific during the 1966 NCAA University Division football season.

Pacific competed as an independent in 1966, and played home games in Pacific Memorial Stadium in Stockton, California. In their first season under head coach Doug Scovil, the Tigers finished with a record of four wins and seven losses (4–7), and were outscored 211–303.

While not a winning record, the 1966 season was an improvement; four wins were as many as they had the previous three seasons combined.

Schedule

Notes

References

Pacific
Pacific Tigers football seasons
Pacific Tigers football